The Scorpion King 4: Quest for Power is a 2015 direct-to-video sword and sorcery action adventure film. It was released on January 6, 2015, on home media. It is the fourth installment in The Scorpion King series and stars Victor Webster in the title role with supporting roles by Ellen Hollman, Lou Ferrigno, Rutger Hauer, Royce Gracie, Eve Torres, and Ian Whyte. This film continues the story of Mathayus, after the events in The Scorpion King 3: Battle for Redemption.

Plot

Mathayus and his partner Drazen (who is under the Akkadian's tutelage) infiltrate the palace of Skizurra to find and acquire an artifact known as the Urn of Kings for King Zakkour of Al-Moraad. In the process, they are discovered and a short fight ensues, revealing Drazen to be a traitor who was really after the Urn.

Mathayus returns to Zakkour, who tells him that the Urn's inscription will show the way to use the powers of Lord Alcaman, a powerful sorcerer who once controlled the entire known world. Under the instructions of the King, Mathayus follows Drazen to the kingdom of Norvania in the Northern Forests to deliver a peace treaty. Drazen gives the Urn to his father King Yannick who shatters it to retrieve the Golden Key of Lord Alcaman, which has the true inscription written on it.

Mathayus arrives in Norvania and is accosted by the king's guards. The soldiers are unable to best Mathayus, who allows himself to be arrested so he can enter the King's castle. In jail, Mathayus meets another inmate, Valina Raskov, who convinces Mathayus to pay her to meet the king. She explains that she is a member of the original royal bloodline and Drazen wishes to cement his father's rise to power with her public execution. Drazen appears with guards and takes Mathayus to be tortured, suspecting his peace treaty is a pretense. However, King Yannick believes Mathayus, releases him, and invites him to a dinner banquet. Drazen assassinates his father with black scorpions and blames it on Mathayus. Before dying, Yannick gives the Key to Mathayus, who resists capture and flees with Valina, who has feigned an illness to escape her cell, using the ensuing chaos to leave the castle.

In the process, Mathayus suffers an arrow wound to the shoulder (as he did when fighting King Memnon). The pair go to Valina's father, Sorrell Raskov, an eccentric scholar and inventor who is unwilling to retake his place as ruler. Sorrell is able to read the inscription on the key, which says they must find a hidden palace in Glenrrossovia in order to find Alcaman's crown, which will let them rule the world. Drazen arrives, takes the key, sets the house on fire, and leaves them to die.

The heroes escape and go to Glenrrossovia, where Drazen is terrorizing the villagers to find the palace. After enlisting a local boy to steal the key, they take it to the Temple of the Goddess, presided over by High Priestess Feminina. They discover the Key inserts into a symbolic hole in a Goddess statue, located in the Temple's underground sanctuary. The sanctuary is pushed through the earth, revealing stained glass that reveals the next direction of the journey.

Valina finds her friend Roland from the dungeon, and he joins their party. They ask Gorak for a map of the Tugarin Forest in which Alcaman's palace is hidden in a mountain and guarded by a dragon. He gives it to them after Valina beats Chancara in a fight. On their way through the forest, they are captured by a pygmy tribe which has one giant member named Daun. Duan's brother Onus is the chief, who attempts to sacrifice them to the spider-like "creatures of the forest." But Mathayus' bellow causes the creatures to retreat, and the tribe to embrace them. Despite warnings of the beast, the heroes proceed towards the mountain, where they find the dragon is really a mechanical contraption.

Finally, they arrive at Alcaman's palace and open the hidden door into the mountain. Roland proves to be a traitor working for Drazen, whose men surround and fill the throne room of Alcaman. Mathayus and Valina fight the attackers, but Sorrell receives a mortal wound from Drazen. Armed with Sorrell's notes, Mathayus proceeds deeper into Alcaman's palace, rigged with traps that kill those with Drazen and finds the Crown of Alcaman believing its power to be the only hope of healing Sorrell. Putting it on, he is covered in fire, but does not burn. As he prepares to return to his comrades, Drazen overpowers him and takes the Crown. Drazen is judged unworthy and the Crown freezes him to death. Mathayus shatters Drazen's frozen body and uses the crown to revive Sorrell, who finally believes in magic.

The group leaves the mountain and seals the door with the Key and Crown inside, telling the remainder of Drazen's men that the power of Lord Alcaman was just a myth. Sorrell is crowned King once more, but gives his crown to Valina, who promises to build a kingdom based on "science and mathematics, truth and reason, and just a little bit of magic".

During the credits, Mathayus is relieved from his service to King Zakkour who allowed him to stay with Queen Valina in her service. Valina and Mathayus share a kiss as Gorak and Chancara are also present at the dinner.

Cast

 Victor Webster as Mathayus, The Scorpion King
 Ellen Hollman as Valina
 Will Kemp as Drazen
 Barry Bostwick as Sorrell Raskov
 Michael Biehn as King Yannick
 Rutger Hauer as King Zakkour
 M. Emmet Walsh as Gorak
 Eve Torres as Chancara
 Brandon Hardesty as Boris
 Rodger Halston as Roland
 Leigh Gill as Chief Onus
 Ian Whyte as Prince Duan
 Corneliu Ulici as Radu
 Esmé Bianco as High Priestess Feminina
 Lou Ferrigno as Skizurra
 Royce Gracie as Anngar
 Roy Nelson as Roykus
 Antônio Silva as Cronkus
 Don "The Dragon" Wilson as Gizzan

Sequel
A fifth film, titled The Scorpion King: Book of Souls, was released in 2018. Zach McGowan replaced Victor Webster as Mathayus. The film featured an all-new cast including Pearl Thusi, Katy Saunders, Nathan Jones and Peter Mensah. The film was directed by Don Michael Paul.

References

External links

 
 
 

2015 films
2015 direct-to-video films
2015 fantasy films
Direct-to-video sequel films
Direct-to-video interquel films
Direct-to-video prequel films
Films scored by Geoff Zanelli
Films set in ancient Egypt
Films shot in Romania
The Mummy (franchise)
The Scorpion King (film series)
American sword and sorcery films
Universal Pictures direct-to-video films
Films directed by Mike Elliott
2010s English-language films
2010s American films
American prequel films